Schooling is the use of schools in education

Schooling may also refer to:

 Education or teaching
 Shoaling and schooling of fish
 Schooling (surname), a surname and people by that name
 Schooling bannerfish (Heniochus diphreutes)

See also
 Unschooling, an educational philosophy and method
 Micro-schooling in education
 Homeschooling in education
 School (disambiguation)